Vera Alexandrovna Vetrova, née Ulyakina (born 21 August 1986 in Gorky) is a Russian volleyball player. She was a member of the Russia women's national volleyball team at the 2010 FIVB Women's World Championship in Japan, the 2011 FIVB Volleyball World Grand Prix in China, the 2011 Women's European Volleyball Championship in Italy and Serbia, and the 2016 Summer Olympics in Rio de Janeiro.

At club level, she played for Indesit (then called Stinol) and Dinamo Kazan before joining Dinamo Moscow in 2011.

Personal life
She is married to Andrey Vetrov and due to her pregnancy she was out on maternity leave for most of 2012 and early 2013. On 1 November 2012 she gave birth to a boy named Nikolay.

Clubs
  Stinol Lipetsk (2002–2009)
  Dinamo Kazan (2009–2011)
  Dynamo Moscow (2011–present)

Awards

National team

Senior
 2010 FIVB World Championship –  Gold medal

Clubs
 2010 Russian Cup –  Gold medal (with Dinamo Kazan)
 2010–11 Russian Championship –  Gold medal (with Dinamo Kazan)
 2011 Russian Cup –  Gold medal (with Dinamo Moscow)
 2011–12 Russian Championship –  Silver medal (with Dinamo Moscow)
 2013 Russian Cup –  Gold medal (with Dinamo Moscow)
 2013–14 Russian Championship –  Silver medal (with Dinamo Moscow)
 2014–15 Russian Championship –  Silver medal (with Dinamo Moscow)
 2015–16 Russian Championship –  Gold medal (with Dinamo Moscow)
 2016 Russian Cup –  Silver medal (with Dinamo Moscow)
 2016–17 Russian Championship –  Gold medal (with Dinamo Moscow)

References

External links
 Profile at CEV
 Profile  at Women's Volleyball Club Dinamo (Moscow)

1986 births
Living people
Sportspeople from Nizhny Novgorod
Russian women's volleyball players
Olympic volleyball players of Russia
Volleyball players at the 2016 Summer Olympics
20th-century Russian women
21st-century Russian women